Hugo Daniel Donato (born 25 October 1974) is an Argentine football manager and former player who played as a midfielder. He is the current manager of Banfield's youth categories.

References

External links

1974 births
Living people
People from Lanús Partido
Argentine footballers
Association football midfielders
Argentine Primera División players
Talleres de Remedios de Escalada footballers
Club Atlético Banfield footballers
Ferro Carril Oeste footballers
Club Almirante Brown footballers
Huracán Corrientes footballers
Estudiantes de Buenos Aires footballers
A.D. Berazategui footballers
Cañuelas footballers
Central Ballester players
Pro Sesto 2013 players
Argentine football managers
Argentine Primera División managers
Club Atlético Banfield managers
Sportspeople from Buenos Aires Province